Kaoh Chiveang is a khum (commune) of Aek Phnum District in Battambang Province in north-western Cambodia.

Villages

 Thvang
 Kampong Prahok
 Anlong Ta Uor
 Preaek Toal
 Kbal Taol

References

Communes of Battambang province
Aek Phnum District